William Dick Murison (24 February 1837 – 28 December 1877) was a 19th-century Member of Parliament and a cricketer from Otago, New Zealand.

Biography

Murison was born in Alyth, Perthshire, Scotland, and migrated to New Zealand in 1856. He played three first-class matches for Otago between 1864 and 1867.

He represented the Waikouaiti electorate from 1866, when he narrowly defeated Julius Vogel, to 1868, when he resigned. From 1871 until his death in 1877, he was editor of the Otago Daily Times.

He died on 28 December 1877 in Dunedin, aged 40. He left a wife and five children.

See also
 List of Otago representative cricketers

References

1837 births
1877 deaths
Members of the New Zealand House of Representatives
New Zealand people of Scottish descent
New Zealand cricketers
Otago cricketers
New Zealand MPs for Dunedin electorates
New Zealand sportsperson-politicians
New Zealand editors
New Zealand magazine editors
19th-century New Zealand politicians
People from Waikouaiti